Yeovil Pen Mill railway station is one of two stations serving the town of Yeovil, Somerset, England. The station is situated just under a mile to the east of the town centre. The station is managed by Great Western Railway, with trains being operated by them and by South Western Railway.

History

The station was opened by the Great Western Railway (GWR) as part of the Wilts, Somerset and Weymouth route on 1 September 1856. Both these lines were  built using the  broad gauge. The GWR line was converted to what become the  standard gauge in June 1874. The B&ER line was mixed and had trains of both gauges from 12 November 1868 but broad gauge trains ceased operation after 30 June 1879 by which time the B&ER had been taken over by the GWR.

The station originally had two platforms, one for each direction, with a train shed for protection. A fire on 18 April 1859 resulted in one building being burnt down. All trains then used the 'up' platform (that built for trains towards  and London Paddington) until the station was rebuilt in the 1880s.

The GWR opened a locomotive depot at the station in September 1856, which operated until January 1959, when it was closed and the locomotives transferred to Yeovil Town depot.

This was opened on 13 October 1943 and offered a new route for trains of war materials as well as a diversion route in the event of bomb damage.

1913 accident 
A passenger train overran a signal on 8 August 1913 and hit the rear of another passenger train. Two people were killed and ten injured.

Stationmasters

George Roberts ca. 1857
William Clarke 1860 - 1863 (formerly station master at )
George Pinkerton 1863 - 1872 (formerly station master at Taplow, afterwards station master at )
George King Forster 1876 - 1887 
Richard Stonnill 1887 - 1894 (formerly station master at Aberdare, afterwards station master at )
Samuel Martin 1894 - 1899
J. Parry 1899 - 1907
W.F. Vaughan 1907 - 1916
Frank George Dunford 1916 - 1926
P. Williams 1926 - 1933 (afterwards station master at Highbridge)
William Gard ca. 1942
L.E. Hole 1944  - ca. 1956 (formerly station master at )

Description
Yeovil Pen Mill has two platforms: platform 1, used predominantly by trains heading north; and platform 3, used mostly by trains heading to Weymouth. Trains using platform 1 could open their doors both sides, as there are physical platforms on both sides. However, the former platform 2 is now disused, and trains open their doors on the left hand side (when arriving from the south).

Services

South Western Railway operate a few services between London Waterloo and Pen Mill, some via  and others via . 

The town is also served by Yeovil Junction railway station, on the West of England Main Line, and served by South Western Railway. Commencing December 2015 a limited regular passenger service began using the rail connection between the two lines. The two stations are just under two miles apart by road.

References

Railway stations in Somerset
Railway stations in Great Britain opened in 1854
Former Great Western Railway stations
Railway stations served by Great Western Railway
Railway stations served by South Western Railway
Buildings and structures in Yeovil
DfT Category E stations